The 1980 Virginia State Elections took place on Election Day, November 4, 1980, the same day as the U.S. Presidential and U.S. House elections in the state. The only statewide elections on the ballot were four constitutional referendums  to amend the Virginia State Constitution. Because Virginia state elections are held on off-years, no statewide officers or state legislative elections were held. All referendums were referred to the voters by the Virginia General Assembly.

Question 1

This amendment asked voters to authorize the Virginia General Assembly to convene for a limited period of time to consider legislation if it is vetoed by the Governor of Virginia.  This makes it slightly easier for the General Assembly to override such vetoes.

Question 2

This amendment asked voters to decrease the maximum debt a local city or town may incur.

Question 3

This amendment asked voters to give the Virginia General Assembly the ability to permit certain personal property tax exemptions for residents who are at least 65 years old or have a disability.

References

1980 Virginia elections